In computer networking, a wildcard certificate is a public key certificate which can be used with multiple sub-domains of a domain. The principal use is for securing web sites with HTTPS, but there are also applications in many other fields.  Compared with conventional certificates, a wildcard certificate can be cheaper and more convenient than a certificate for each sub-domain. Multi-domain wildcard certificates further simplify the complexity and reduce costs by securing multiple domains and their sub-domains.

Example
A single wildcard certificate for  will secure all these subdomains on the  domain:

 
 
 
 

Instead of getting separate certificates for subdomains, you can use a single certificate for all main domains and subdomains and reduce cost. 

Because the wildcard only covers one level of subdomains (the asterisk doesn't match full stops), these domains would not be valid for the certificate:
 

The "naked" domain is valid when added separately as a Subject Alternative Name:
 
Note possible exceptions by CAs, for example wildcard-plus cert by DigiCert contains an automatic "Plus" property for the naked domain .

Type of wildcard certificates 
Wildcard certificates are categorized on the basis of validation level, number of domain and number of servers it can be used with. Likewise they are named as domain validation wildcard certificate, organisation validation wildcard certificate and extended validation wildcard certificate when we categorize them according to validation level. The name Multi-domain wildcard certificates and Multi-server wildcard certificates are given according to number of domain and number of server. All types of wildcard certificates signed by popular CAs are categorized and listed internet. Therefore there are types of wildcard which can secure multiple domains, multiple servers and provide different levels of validation.

Limitations

It is not possible to get a wildcard for an Extended Validation Certificate.  A workaround could be to add every virtual host name in the Subject Alternative Name (SAN) extension, the major problem being that the certificate needs to be reissued whenever a new virtual server is added. (See Transport Layer Security § Support for name-based virtual servers for more information.)

Wildcards can be added as domains in multi-domain certificates or Unified Communications Certificates (UCC). In addition, wildcards themselves can have  extensions, including other wildcards. For example, the wildcard certificate  has  as a Subject Alternative Name. Thus it secures  as well as the completely different website name .

 argues against wildcard certificates on security grounds, in particular "partial wildcards".

Examples

The wildcard applies only to one level of the domain name.

 is OK. It will match  but not  and not 

The wildcard may appear anywhere inside a label as a "partial wildcard" according to early specifications

 is OK. It will match  but not 

 is OK and matches 
 is OK and matches 
 is OK and matches 

However, use of "partial-wildcard" certs is not recommended.  As of 2011, partial wildcard support is optional, and is explicitly disallowed in SubjectAltName headers that are required for multi-name certificates. All major browsers have deliberately removed support for partial-wildcard certificates; they will result in a "SSL_ERROR_BAD_CERT_DOMAIN" error. Similarly, it is typical for standard libraries in programming languages to not support "partial-wildcard" certificates. For example, any "partial-wildcard" certificate will not work with the latest versions of both Python and Go. Thus, 

Do not allow a label that consists entirely of just a wildcard unless it is the left-most label
 is not allowed.

A cert with multiple wildcards in a name is not allowed.

A cert with  plus a top-level domain is not allowed.

Too general and should not be allowed.

Do not allow wildcards in an international label.
 is 
 is not allowed
 is allowed

References

Relevant RFCs
 
 
  

Public-key cryptography
Key management